This is a list of schools in Italy, listed by region.

Abruzzo
Canadian College Italy

Campania
Classical Lyceum Umberto I
Liceo Sannazaro
Naples American High School

Emilia-Romagna
ITC Luigi Paolini

Friuli-Venezia Giulia
Aviano Middle/High School
Liceo Classico Jacopo Stellini
United World College of the Adriatic

Lazio
American Overseas School of Rome
Ennio Quirino Visconti Liceo Ginnasio
Lycée français Chateaubriand (Rome)
Marymount International School of Rome
Massimiliano Massimo Institute
New School Rome
Rome International School
St. George's British International School
St. Stephen's International School
Scuola Giapponese di Roma

Liguria
Deledda International School

Lombardy
American School of Milan
European School, Varese
German School of Milan
International School of Milan
Scuola Giapponese di Milano
Scuola Militare Teulié

Piedmont
Liceo classico Cavour
Liceo Classico Massimo d'Azeglio

Tuscany
Cicognini National Boarding School
International School of Florence
Licei Linguistico e Pedagogico di Montepulciano
L'Istituto Statale della Ss. Annunziata

Veneto
The English International School of Padua
Istituto Maffei
Liceo Scientifico Statale "Angelo Messedaglia"
Scuole Alle Stimate
Vicenza American High School

See also

Education in Italy
List of universities in Italy
List of architecture schools in Italy
List of academies of fine art in Italy
 Open access in Italy

 
Italy
Italy
Schools
Schools
Schools